The list of shipwrecks in June 1914 includes ships sunk, foundered, grounded, or otherwise lost during June 1914.

4 June

6 June

8 June

9 June

11 June

14 June

15 June

16 June

17 June

18 June

21 June

23 June

24 June

25 June

27 June

29 June

30 June

Unknown date

References

1914-06
 06
1914